Fernando Gabriel Tatís Medina Jr. (born 2 January 1999), nicknamed "El Niño" or "Bebo", is a Dominican professional baseball shortstop and outfielder for the San Diego Padres of Major League Baseball (MLB). He is the son of former MLB player Fernando Tatís Sr. Tatís Jr. made his MLB debut in 2019, won the Silver Slugger Award in 2020, and was named an All-Star in 2021, before missing all of the 2022 season due to injury and a PED suspension.

Early life
Tatís was born in San Pedro de Macoris, in the Dominican Republic. His father was already playing in his third year of professional baseball when Tatís was born, playing for the Cardinals at the time. He spent a lot of time in big league clubhouses, and was very athletic and held an interest in baseball from a young age. He often practiced with Robinson Cano, who is also from San Pedro de Macoris.

Professional career

Minor leagues
The Chicago White Sox signed Tatís as an international free agent from the Dominican Prospect League in 2015. On 4 June 2016, before he had played a professional game, the White Sox traded Tatís, then 17 years old, and Erik Johnson to the Padres for James Shields. Tatís spent 2016 with the Arizona League Padres of the Rookie-level Arizona League and the Tri-City Dust Devils of the Class A-Short Season Northwest League, batting a combined .273 with four home runs and 25 runs batted in (RBI) in 55 games; on defense, he made 15 errors and had a .904 fielding percentage.

In 2017, Tatís played 117 games for the Fort Wayne TinCaps of the Class A Midwest League and 14 games for the San Antonio Missions of the Class AA Texas League, posting a combined .278 batting average with 22 home runs, 75 RBI, and 32 stolen bases as he was caught 15 times, and on defense, he made 30 errors and had a .936 fielding percentage. In 2017–18, he played 17 games at shortstop for the Estrellas de Oriente of the Dominican Winter League, batting .246 with one home run and three RBI.

Tatís entered 2018 as one of the top prospects in the minor leagues. He returned to play shortstop for San Antonio, and in 88 games he batted .286 with 16 home runs, 43 RBI, and 16 stolen bases. On 23 July 2018, Tatís underwent season-ending surgery for a broken left thumb and ligament damage suffered during a head-first slide. He returned to play for the Estrellas for the 2018–19 winter season.

San Diego Padres (2019–2021)

2019 season

At the beginning of 2019, Tatís was ranked as one of the top three prospects in baseball by MLB Pipeline, ESPN, Baseball America, and Baseball Prospectus. On 26 March 2019, the Padres announced that Tatís made their Opening Day roster. In his major league debut, he recorded two hits against the San Francisco Giants. On 1 April 2019, Tatís hit his first major league home run.

In August, Tatís injured his back, which ended his 2019 season. He finished the season hitting .317/.379/.590 with 22 home runs, 61 runs, and 106 hits over 84 games. He came in third place in balloting for the National League Rookie of the Year Award, behind Pete Alonso and Mike Soroka.

2020 season
In the 2020 season, Tatís was part of a four-game streak in August in which the San Diego Padres hit four grand slams, and, notably, was at each base position over the four. There was a controversy involving Tatís when he swung at a 3–0 pitch in the eighth inning, hitting an opposite-field grand slam against the Texas Rangers. This caused some discussion at the time regarding breaking an "unwritten rule of baseball" since the Padres were already up by seven runs.

In 2020, Tatís led the NL in power-speed number (13.4) and batted .277/.366/.571 (10th in the league) with 50 runs (2nd), 17 home runs (2nd), 42 RBI (4th), and 11 stolen bases (4th) in 224 at-bats. Of all major league hitters, he had the highest average exit velocity (95.9 MPH), percentage of hard-hit balls (62.2), and percentage of barrels/plate appearance (12.5%).

In Game 2 of the 2020 Wild Card Series against the St. Louis Cardinals, Tatís was able to help bring the Padres back into winning position by hitting two home runs that made it possible for the Padres to win the series and head to the next round against the Dodgers, which they lost in three straight games.

Tatís finished in fourth place for the National League MVP Award in 2020, behind Freddie Freeman, Mookie Betts, and his teammate Manny Machado.

2021 season
Before the 2021 season, Tatís signed a 14-year, $340 million contract extension with the Padres, at the time the third-richest in MLB history, behind deals signed by Mike Trout and Mookie Betts, and the richest signed by a player not yet eligible for salary arbitration. Part of Tatís's future earnings will be given to Big League Advance as part of an agreement Tatís made while in the minor leagues in order to receive early money that he used to "afford a personal trainer, higher quality food and better housing".

On 5 April, Tatís sustained a left shoulder subluxation while swinging at a pitch during a game against the San Francisco Giants. He was subsequently placed on the 10-day injured list, but avoided serious injury and returned to the Padres lineup on 16 April.On 23 April, exactly 22 years after his father hit two grand slams in one inning, Tatís hit two home runs off of Clayton Kershaw, and he also hit two more home runs in another game off of Trevor Bauer. All four home runs took place at the same venue where Tatís's father made history as well. The Padres won 6–1.

On 12 May, players from the San Diego Padres, including Tatís and Wil Myers, tested positive for COVID-19; Tatís was placed on the injured list due to COVID-19. On 19 May, the Padres activated Tatís from the COVID-19 IL.

On 2 June, Tatís was named the National League Player of the Month for the month of May, batting .353/.440/.824 with nine home runs, eight stolen bases, 26 RBIs, and 21 runs scored in 20 games. On 25 June, Tatís had his first three-homer game in his career against the Arizona Diamondbacks to give the Padres an 11–5 win.

On 1 July, Tatís was selected to start his first All-Star Game, becoming the first All-Star starter from the Padres since Tony Gwynn. In a 6 July 2021, game, Tatís received media attention for an unusually high catch, which appeared to resemble a double jump typically seen in video games. On 24 July, Tatís hit his 30th home run of the season, becoming the fourth Padres player to have hit 30 home runs and stolen 20 bases in a season, after Steve Finley, Wil Myers, and Ryan Klesko. He accomplished this feat over 82 games, the lowest for any player age 22 or younger.

Tatís suffered a second left shoulder subluxation while playing against the Colorado Rockies on 30 July and was placed on the 10-day IL. During his stint on the IL, Tatís trained with Padres first base coach Wayne Kirby to transition into an outfielder. He was activated from the IL on 15 August and played right field in his first game back from injury.

Tatís finished the 2021 season hitting .282/.364/.611 with 97 RBIs, 25 stolen bases, and an NL-leading 42 home runs. He also led the majors in at-bats per home run (11.4), and the highest percentage of hard-hit balls (48%). He won his second consecutive Silver Slugger Award and finished third in NL MVP voting behind Bryce Harper and Juan Soto.

2022 season

On 16 March 2022, Tatís underwent surgery due to a fractured scaphoid bone suffered during the offseason. He was expected to return within three months. Although the cause of the injury was not confirmed, general manager A. J. Preller alluded to a motorcycle accident that Tatís suffered in December 2021 in the Dominican Republic. When a reporter asked when his motorcycle accident occurred, Tatís replied "Which one?," suggesting that he had been involved in multiple such accidents in the 2021–22 offseason.

On 12 August 2022, Tatís was suspended for 80 games after testing positive for Clostebol, an anabolic steroid. He stated this was from a medication he took to treat ringworm that he did not check for steroids, though skepticism arose from that claim. On 27 August 2022, Adidas announced that they would be dropping Tatís from his sponsorship with the athletic company, citing, "We believe that sport should be fair," Adidas said in a statement via ESPN. We have a clear policy on doping and can confirm that our partnership with Fernando Tatis Jr. will not continue."

2023 season
As a result of punishment stemming from a failed drug test in 2022, Tatís will miss the first 21 games of the 2023 season.

Player profile
Tatís, a 6 ft 3 in, 217 lb (1.90 m, 98 kg) shortstop, is widely considered to be a five-tool player due to his various abilities. In his 2021 season, Tatís hit 42 home runs, the most in the National League that year and only the fifth Padre ever to hit 40+ home runs in a single season. His .282 batting average in 2021 was the highest among leaderboard-qualified Padre batters. Tatís is among the fastest players in baseball, posting an average sprint speed of 29.3 feet per second through his first three seasons and placing in the 98th percentile of all MLB baserunners in 2020.

Despite receiving praise for his athleticism and throwing range, Tatís has been criticized for committing errors at a high rate. In 2019, he committed 18 errors, the fifth-most in MLB that season. Although he committed only three errors in the shortened 2020 season and raised his fielding percentage 40 points to .984%, he committed 21 errors in 2021, the third-most in the league that year. Critics have alleged that Tatís's highlight-reel defensive plays distract from his inconsistency on easy plays.

Tatís has been credited as one of the most exciting star players in baseball. ESPN ranked him as the most entertaining MLB player in 2020.

Personal life
Tatís's father, Fernando Sr., played third base in the major leagues from 1997 to 2010. His mother is named Maria. His younger brother, Elijah, was an infielder in the Chicago White Sox organization, signed in 2019. Tatís is the cover athlete of MLB The Show 21, and at age 22 the youngest player to be featured as the cover star.

See also

 List of largest sports contracts
 List of Major League Baseball players from the Dominican Republic
 List of second-generation Major League Baseball players
 San Diego Padres award winners and league leaders

References

External links

1999 births
Living people
Amarillo Sod Poodles players
Arizona League Padres players
Dominican Republic expatriate baseball players in the United States
Dominican Republic sportspeople in doping cases
Estrellas Orientales players
Fort Wayne TinCaps players
Major League Baseball players from the Dominican Republic
Major League Baseball shortstops
National League home run champions
San Antonio Missions players
San Diego Padres players
Silver Slugger Award winners
Sportspeople from San Pedro de Macorís
Tri-City Dust Devils players
Tri-City ValleyCats players